The 1979 Congoleum Classic, also known as the Volvo Tennis Games, was a men's tennis tournament played on outdoor hard courts. It was the 6th edition of the Indian Wells Masters and was part of the 1979 Colgate-Palmolive Grand Prix. It was played at the Mission Hills Country Club in Rancho Mirage, California in the United States and was held from February 12 through February 18, 1979. Eighth-seeded Roscoe Tanner won his second consecutive singles title at the event and earned $35,000 first-prize money.

Finals

Singles

 Roscoe Tanner defeated  Brian Gottfried 6–4, 6–2 
 It was Tanner's 1st title of the year and the 26th of his career.

Doubles

 Gene Mayer /  Sandy Mayer defeated  Cliff Drysdale /  Bruce Manson 6–4, 7–6 
 It was Gene Mayer's 1st title of the year and the 8th of his career. It was Sandy Mayer's 1st title of the year and the 20th of his career.

References

External links
 
 ATP – tournament profile
 ITF – tournament edition details

 
1979 Congoleum Classic
Congoleum Classic
Congoleum Classic
Congoleum Classic
Congoleum Classic